This page is a list of the Baltimore Ravens NFL Draft selections.  The Ravens franchise began when the Cleveland Browns moved to Baltimore in 1996, leaving their team name, uniforms, and franchise records in Cleveland.  The first draft the Ravens participated in was 1996, when they selected offensive tackle Jonathan Ogden of UCLA for their first selection as the Ravens.

Key

1996 Draft

1997 Draft

1998 Draft

1999 Draft

2000 Draft

2001 Draft

2002 Draft

2003 Draft

2004 Draft

2005 Draft

2006 Draft

2007 Draft

2008 Draft

2009 Draft

2010 Draft

2011 Draft

2012 Draft

2013 Draft

2014 Draft

2015 Draft

2016 Draft

2017 Draft

2018 Draft

2019 Draft

2020 Draft

2021 Draft

2022 Draft

See also
History of the Baltimore Ravens
List of Baltimore Ravens first-round draft picks
List of professional American football drafts

National Football League Draft history by team
draft history